The World Council for Psychotherapy is an NGO with consultative status at the Economic and Social Council of the United Nations.  It was founded in 1995, has its headquarters in Vienna, and holds a World Congress every three years with more than a thousand participants.

Objectives
The main objectives of the association are the promotion of psychotherapy on all continents (based on the principles in the Strasbourg Declaration on Psychotherapy in 1990), to improve the conditions of patients, to cooperate with national and international organizations to improve crisis management and peacekeeping, and to unify world training standards. Members are both psychotherapists and organizations. President of the WCP is Alfred Pritz.

The World Certificate for Psychotherapy (WCPC) is only awarded on the basis of recognized psychotherapy training and aims to encourage mobility within the profession. Each year, together with the city of Vienna, the Council awards the International Sigmund Freud Award for Psychotherapy.

World Congress for Psychotherapy

 1996 Vienna
 1999 Vienna
 2002 Vienna
 2005 Buenos Aires
 2008 Beijing
 2011 Sydney
 2014 Durban
 2017 Paris
 2020 Moscow
 2022 Moscow

References

Further reading
 Alfred Pritz (Ed.): Globalized Psychotherapy. Universitätsverlag, Vienna 2002, .
 Ganesh Shankar: Psychotherapy. Yoga and traditional Therapies of East and West. Jagdama Publ., New Delhi 2004, .

External links

Schema Therapy
Well-being Psychologist 

Psychotherapy organizations
International medical and health organizations
International organisations based in Austria